Shezë is a former municipality in the Elbasan County, central Albania. At the 2015 local government reform it became a subdivision of the municipality Peqin. The population at the 2011 census was 3,177. The municipal unit consists of the villages Shezë e Vogël, Shezë e Madhë, Pekisht, Trash, Algjinaj, Gryksh i Vogël and Karthnek.

References

Former municipalities in Elbasan County
Administrative units of Peqin
Villages in Elbasan County